The 1941 Arizona Wildcats football team was an American football team that represented the University of Arizona in the Border Conference during the 1941 college football season.  In their third season under head coach Mike Casteel, the Wildcats compiled a 7–3 record (5–0 against Border opponents), finished in a tie for the conference championship, and outscored opponents, 253 to 146.  The team played its home games at Arizona Stadium in Tucson, Arizona.

Halfback Emil Banjavicic was the team captain. Three Arizona players were selected by the conference coaches as first-team players on the 1941 All-Border Conference football team: end Henry Stanton; tackle Jock Irish; and guard Stanley Petropolis. Halfbacks Banjavicic and William Smetana and center Murl McCain were selected to the second team.

Schedule

References

Arizona
Arizona Wildcats football seasons
Border Conference football champion seasons
Arizona Wildcats football